Dillo is a web browser.

Dillo may also refer to:

Places
Dillo (woreda), a district in Ethiopia
Dillo, a river in Chile

People
Dillo Lombardi (1858-1938), Italian film director

Venues 
The 'Dillo (1970–1980), nickname for a bygone Texas music hall in Austin, Armadillo World Headquarters

See also
Dillo Day, American music festival
Dillo Dirt, compost made by the city of Austin, United States